Kevin Porter may refer to:

Sports
Kevin Porter (American football) (born 1966), American football player and coach
Kevin Porter (basketball) (born 1950), American former basketball player
Kevin Porter Jr. (born 2000), American basketball player
Kevin Porter (ice hockey) (born 1986), American ice hockey center

Others
Kevin Porter (actor) (born 1969), American actor and director
Kevin Porter (character), fictional school guidance counselor in the American streaming television series 13 Reasons Why

See also
Kevin Potter